Ilia Isaev (born 12 August 1980) is a Russian former competitive ice dancer. With partner Anastasia Belova, he won bronze medals at the 2000 Skate Israel, 2001 Nebelhorn Trophy, and 2002 Nebelhorn Trophy.

Competitive highlights 
With Belova

References

External links 
 

1980 births
Russian male ice dancers
Living people
Competitors at the 2001 Winter Universiade